The Fachkrankenhaus Coswig (FKC) hospital is a clinic specializing in the treatment of bronchial and pulmonary diseases. In 2018, a total of approx. 8,000 patients were treated in the FKC hospital which has 171 beds.

Fachkrankenhaus Coswig 
The property is located at Neucoswiger Straße 21 in the Saxon city of Coswig. The entire historic building, which was built between 1890 and 1896, is officially listed as the historic landmark Heilstätte Lindenhof, i.e. Sanitarium Linden Court. Numerous individually listed structures and monuments are actually located on the premises, including the park which is a protected landscape garden.

History 
The Lindenhof, which was first officially mentioned in 1783, was purchased by the neurologist Friedrich Gustav Bräunlich (1800–1875) in 1845 who transformed the vineyard and estate into a psychiatric clinic. He had previously owned a sanitarium for the mentally ill called Wackerbarths Ruh' in the neighboring municipality of Niederlößnitz since 1835, which he closed after having moved to the new facility. On August 1, 1891, his Lindenhof was sold to a new owner, Reginald H. Pierson, who created a park and built patients' villas in the Swiss chalet style, a utility building, and a social center by 1892. The facilities continued to serve as a psychiatric clinic for the "upper class." Due to economic constraints, it was not possible to operate the hospital any longer after the First World War. The entire hospital complex is a historic landmark which is why it is to be preserved in its entirety as a listed area.

In 1920, the hospital was transformed into a sanitarium for patients with tuberculosis. A modern building complex was added as a surgical clinic in 1931. Since 1996, the FKC has been an academic teaching hospital of the University Hospital and Medical School Dresden. After additional new construction, the new inpatient building, the new Intensive Care Unit as well as the renovated operating rooms were ready for use in 2003. In 2007, the modernization of the old hospital facilities, which also included the creation of a new unit for infectious diseases, was completed and the Oncological Day Clinic was officially inaugurated with 6 beds. Over the next few years, diverse additional construction measures were carried out; this included the conversion of the Radiology Department and the social center into doctor's offices. A new cafeteria was opened, for example, and one of the units was converted into a Pneumological Intensive Care Unit (PINT). The Palliative Care Unit was officially inaugurated in 2016, followed by the founding of the East German Lung Center (ODLZ) as well as the Competence Network for Pulmonary Diseases one year later.

Departments 

 Allergology
 Anesthesiology
 Respiratory Medicine
 Infectiology and Tuberculosis
 Intensive Therapy
 Palliative Medicine
 Pneumology
 Pneumological Oncology
 Radiology
 Thoracic Surgery
 Interstitial Pulmonary Diseases

Centers 

 Lung Cancer Center
 Thoracic Center
 Weaning Center (weaning from artificial respiration)
 Sleep Lab

Partners and Cooperations 

In order to safeguard and guarantee excellent, patient and quality-oriented health care in the vicinity of residential areas, the Fachkrankenhaus Coswig founded the Competence Network for Pulmonary Diseases (KoLE e.V.) association.

External links

References 

Hospitals in Germany
Hospitals established in 1920
Medical and health organisations based in Saxony
Coswig, Saxony